Gaspare Gori-Mancini (April 1653 – 16 July 1727) was an Italian prelate who was appointed as Bishop of Malta in 1722.

Biography
Gori-Mancini was born in the spring of 1653 in Rigomagno in the Province of Siena Italy. In 1676 he was ordained priest of the Sovereign Military Order of Malta. On 1 June 1722 Pope Innocent XIII appointed him as the successor of Bishop Joaquín Canaves as Bishop of Malta. He was consecrated on 7 June 1722 by Cardinal Antonfelice Zondadari. In 1723 Bishop Gori-Mancini, duly authorised by the Holy See, transferred the Seminary of the diocese from Mdina to Valletta. Gori-Mancini was bishop during the reign of Grand Master António Manoel de Vilhena. Bishop Gori-Mancini died after only five years as bishop on 16 July 1727 at the age of 74. He was buried in St. John's Co-Cathedral in Valletta. The tabernacle door and altar front with a medallion depicting the martyrdom of St. Catherine in the Chapel of Italy of the same Church were donated by him but later stolen by Napoleon.

References

1653 births
1727 deaths
18th-century Italian Roman Catholic bishops
Bishops of Malta